Boris Bakal (born September 18, 1959 in Zagreb) is a theatre/film director and actor.

Biography
Boris Bakal was born in Zagreb, Socialist Federal Republic of Yugoslavia (now the Republic of Croatia)

He was a visiting scholar/lecturer and researcher at New York University (1998), Stony Brook University (1999), Studio Art Centres International (Florence, 2000), and Columbia University (New York, 2003),  Leiden University (2008), Kent University (Canterbury, 2013), DAMU (Prague, 2014) and others.

He was an artistic director and curator of the multidisciplinary urban festival "Hunting Season" (Stagione di Caccia) in Bologna, (Italy), from 1999 to 2001, and co-director and co-curator of Migrative Art Festival (within the Flying University Project), Louvain la Nuove (Belgium), 1993–1995 and Tunel Festival, Zagreb (Croatia) in 1995.

He is also a co-founder and co-author of the projects of Bacači Sjenki/Shadow Casters (since 2001).

Bibliography (selection) 
 Sandra Uskokovic - "Choreographing architecture" - City, journal of analysis of urban trends, culture, theory, policy, action, Volume 21, 2017 - Issue 6, Print  Online , Routledge - Taylor&Francis Group, UK, 2017,
 Boris Bakal/Sandra Uskokovic – "Urban Hum: Memory Theater of the City" – Journal of Urban Cultural Research vol. 11, Osaka City University & Chulalongkorn University, Bangkok/Osaka, 2015 
 Boris Bakal – "The Legend of the Boat" – Oris magazine for architecture no. 91, Oris House for Architecture, Zagreb, 2015 
 Duška Radosavljević – Theatre Making – Palgrave Macmillan, 2013
 Duška Radosavljević – The Contemporary Ensemble: Interviews with Theatre-Makers – Rutlege,  2012 
 Boris Bakal – "Fragments about the Space" – Kolo no. 4, Matica Hrvatska, Zagreb, 2007
 Boris Bakal – "The Naked and the Dead/Goli i mrtvi", Zarez 210, 2007
 Boris Bakal – "Recognizing networks", a chapter in the book: Katrin Klingan and Ines Kappert/Relations – Leap into the City: Chişinău, Sofia, Pristina, Warsaw, Zagreb, Ljubljana – 7 scenes from Europe – DuMont Literatur und Kunst Verlag, Cologne,  2006 
 Katarina Pejović  – "The Portret of Multimedia Artist", Up&Underground, 2006

References

External links

Living people
Croatian theatre directors
1959 births
Male actors from Zagreb
Theatre people from Zagreb